The British Military Mission to Poland was an effort by Britain to aid the nascent Second Polish Republic after it achieved its independence in November 1918, at the end of the First World War. It worked in parallel with the larger and much more significant French Military Mission to Poland. It was commanded by British General Adrian Carton De Wiart, who succeeded General Louis Botha. Owing to debates within the British government on its policy towards the new government in Russia, the mission was not staffed or fully utilised when compared to the French mission.

It should not be confused with the Interallied Mission to Poland, an improvised effort launched by Lloyd George on 21 July 1920, at the height of the crisis before the Battle of Warsaw.

References

See also
 British Expeditionary Force

20th-century military history of the United Kingdom
Polish–Soviet War
Poland–United Kingdom military relations
1918 in Poland
1918 in military history